The Nazi Doctors: Medical Killing and the Psychology of Genocide was written by Robert Jay Lifton and published in 1986, analyzing the role of German doctors in carrying out a genocide. In the work Lifton details the medical procedures occurring before and during the Holocaust and explores the paradoxical theme of healing killing in which one race was healed by eliminating another; a concept that many used to morally justify their actions. Throughout the book, Lifton provides quotes from interviews he conducted with SS doctors and with victims.

The book was awarded the 1987 Los Angeles Times Book Prize and the 1987 National Jewish Book Award in the Holocaust category.

Synopsis 
The Nazi Doctors is composed of three parts. In the first part the book describes in detail the four stages that took place before the Holocaust. Starting with coercive sterilization, proceeding to the killing of children and then adults; medical reasonings were used to justify the actions of Nazi doctors. The progression of the killings began legally with sterilization laws and then turned into illegal actions that were permitted by the government. This time period was referred to as Nazi Germany, in which the Nazi party took over and brainwashed most citizens. The second part of the book begins with the transportation of the victims to the camps, their arrival, life at the camp, and how different members of the camp adjusted and evolved. The ideology driven by Adolf Hitler received so much support from doctors and Nazis that it was possible for them to set up concentration camps in which mass medical killings occurred.

After the genocide was discovered, and the Holocaust was ended, people were left in disbelief as to how such actions of crime could have undergone and for so long. Part III of the book provides an analysis to the moral conflicts faced by the doctors and faces the reality of the genocide. Lifton explores the behavior individually and collectively of the doctors and discusses how the socialization to killing could have come about.

Reception 

The Nazi Doctors has been reviewed by JAMA, The Journal of Psychiatry and Law, and The Journal of Medicine and Philosophy.

References

History books about the Holocaust
Nazi human subject research
1986 non-fiction books